Kirk Hudson (born 12 December 1986) is an English former professional footballer who played as a right winger in the Football League, most notably for Aldershot Town. He also played league football for Brentford and AFC Bournemouth.

Career

Youth years 
A right winger, Hudson began his career as a schoolboy with Ipswich Town. He entered the academy at Celtic in 2004 and was a part of the team which finished as runners-up in the 2004 Jersey International Tournament. Hudson won the 2004–05 SPL U19 League and Scottish Youth Cup double with the U19 team, but was released in May 2005.

AFC Bournemouth 
During the 2005–06 pre-season, Hudson joined League One club AFC Bournemouth on trial and impressed enough to sign a three-month contract on 5 August 2005. He was a regular inclusion on the substitutes' bench early in the regular season and made his professional debut as a late substitute for James Keene in a 2–1 win over Swindon Town on 17 September. Hudson again appeared as a late substitute in the following League Cup match, but was not called into the squad again and was released at the end of his contract.

Aldershot Town

Football Conference (2006–2008) 
After a non-playing spell with Conference South club Thurrock and failing a trial with League One high-flyers Southend United, Hudson joined Conference Premier club Aldershot Town on trial in January 2006. He made his debut with a start in a Hampshire Senior Cup quarter-final match versus Basingstoke Town on 14 January and scored both the Shots' goals in the 3–2 defeat. After the match, he joined the club on non-contract terms and made his league debut with a late substitute cameo in a 3–1 victory over Halifax Town on 21 January. After recovering from a bout of mumps, Hudson was a regular in the team through to the end of the season and finished 2005–06 with 13 appearances and four goals. He signed a permanent contract in July 2006.

After three substitute appearances early in the 2006–07 season, Hudson was sent out on loan to get regular game time. Upon his return to the team in November 2006, he was utilised as an impact substitute and scored four goals in six appearances during Aldershot's Hampshire Senior Cup-winning campaign. Hudson signed a new one-year contract in April 2007 and had an excellent 2007–08 season, making 48 appearances and scoring 12 goals to help the Shots to the Conference Premier title and promotion to the Football League. He also contributed to Aldershot's Conference League Cup Final victory over Rushden & Diamonds (scoring a goal in the 3–3 draw and then converting a penalty in the deciding shootout), in addition to winning the February 2008 Conference Premier Player of the Month award and being voted the Conference Young Player of the Year. Hudson signed a new two-year contract in March 2008.

Football League (2008–2010) 
Now playing League Two football, Hudson began the 2008–09 season as a regular starter, but despite scoring five goals by mid-November 2008, manager Garry Waddock felt the need to challenge him to play with more consistency. Hudson responded by scoring three goals in four matches in December, which earned him a nomination for the League Two Player of the Month award. A season of consolidation in the Football League ended with Hudson having made 48 appearances and scored 13 goals, an improvement on his figures of the previous season in the Conference Premier.

Despite again beginning the season as a starter, Hudson found the going harder in 2009–10, in a Shots team pushing for a playoff place. He lost his starting place in January 2010 and only regained it for four matches in March. Just two defeats from the final 11 matches of the season saw Aldershot finish sixth, which qualified the club for a playoff place. The Shots were defeated 3–0 on aggregate to Rotherham United in the semi-finals and Hudson made what would be his final appearance for the club as a second-half substitute in the second leg on 19 May. Hudson was released by manager Kevin Dillon after the defeat and he finished his career at the Recreation Ground with 172 appearances and 42 goals.

Ashford Town (loan) 
On 9 August 2006, Hudson joined Southern League Western Division club Ashford Town (Middlesex) on a one-month loan, which was later extended for a second month. He made four league appearances.

Brentford 
On 28 June 2010, Hudson joined League One club Brentford on a two-year contract for a fee that was later decided by an "amicable agreement". Manager Andy Scott stated in early July that he hoped to convert Hudson into a centre forward. Hudson picked up a groin injury a week before the beginning of the 2010–11 season, but returned to fitness in September and made his debut as a substitute for Nicky Adams after 66 minutes of a 1–0 defeat to Leyton Orient late in the month. Hudson made just three further substitute appearances over the following six weeks and requested a loan move in November 2010. On 31 December, he departed on loan until the end of the 2010–11 season.

Hudson was ruled out of the early months of the 2011–12 season with a hip injury suffered in July 2011. After returning to fitness in October, potential loan moves to Southend United and Hayes & Yeading United fell through and he departed Griffin Park by mutual consent on 12 March 2012, having failed to win a call into the first team squad since November 2010.

AFC Wimbledon (loan) 
On 31 December 2010, Hudson reunited with his former Aldershot Town manager Terry Brown on loan at Conference Premier club AFC Wimbledon. Despite missing three weeks with a recurrence of the groin injury suffered in July 2010, Hudson made 14 appearances and scored one goal during the second half of the 2010–11 season.

Return to non-League football 
On 21 August 2012, Hudson joined Isthmian League Premier Division club Canvey Island. He made just three substitute appearances before departing the club on 20 September. Hudson later played for Essex Olympian League clubs White Ensign and Shoebury Town.

Personal life 
Hudson is an Arsenal supporter. As of November 2005, he was living in Shoeburyness.

Honours
Aldershot Town
Conference Premier: 2007–08
Conference League Cup: 2007–08
Hampshire Senior Cup: 2006–07

Individual

Football Conference Young Player of the Year: 2007–08
 Football Conference Premier Player of the Month: February 2008

Career statistics

References

External links

1986 births
Living people
People from Rochford
Association football forwards
English footballers
Ipswich Town F.C. players
Celtic F.C. players
AFC Bournemouth players
Thurrock F.C. players
Aldershot Town F.C. players
Brentford F.C. players
Ashford Town (Middlesex) F.C. players
AFC Wimbledon players
Canvey Island F.C. players
White Ensign F.C. players
English Football League players
National League (English football) players
Isthmian League players
Black British sportspeople
Association football wingers
Southern Football League players